Thomas Fitzpatrick (27 March 1860 – 16 July 1912), pen name Fitz, was an Irish political cartoonist.

Fitzpatrick was born in Cork.   He contributed to the satirical magazine Pat (published from 1881-1883), the Weekly Freeman, the Irish Figaro, the Irish Emerald, the Weekly Nation, Punch and the New York Gaelic American, and was for a time chief cartoonist of the National Press.  In 1905 he launched his own satirical magazine, The Lepracaun, which he edited and drew most of the cartoons and illustrations for until his health began to fail in 1911. James Joyce contributed short pieces and cartoon ideas. He died in Dublin.

A collection of Fitzpatrick's cartoons from The Lepracaun was published in book form in 1913.  He was also a master illuminator and with his daughter, artist Mary Fitzpatrick O'Brien, he produced many illuminated and richly decorated scrolls and paintings, many reflecting the influence of the early Celtic Revival.  He was the grandfather of the Irish fantasy artist Jim Fitzpatrick.

References
Theo Snoddy, Dictionary of Irish Artists: 20th Century, Merlin Publishing, 2002 
Jim Fitzpatrick - biography part 2 page 1

Further reading

1860 births
1912 deaths
Irish editorial cartoonists
People from Cork (city)